Raymond W. Yeung (born June, 1962) is an information theorist and the Choh-Ming Li Professor of Information Engineering at The Chinese University of Hong Kong, where he serves as Co-Director of Institute of Network Coding.

Biography
Yeung was born in Hong Kong. He attended Wah Yan College, Kowloon for secondary school education. Then he went to the United States to study at Cornell University, where he obtained his BS, MEng, and PhD degrees in Electrical Engineering in 1984, 1985, and 1988, respectively. 

In 1988, he joined the Performance Analysis Department at  AT&T Bell Laboratories, Holmdel. Since 1991, he has been with The Chinese University of Hong Kong, where he is currently Choh-Ming Li Professor of Information Engineering and Co-Director of Institute of Network Coding.

Yeung’s research interests are in information theory,  network coding, and probability theory. His pioneering contributions to network coding laid the groundwork for the field. He has published two textbooks on information theory and network coding (2002, 2008) 
that have been adopted by over 100 universities. His MOOC on information theory, first offered on Coursera in 2014, has reached over 60,000 students to date. See Bibliography below.

Awards
 2001: Croucher Senior Research Fellowship 
 2005: IEEE Information Theory Society Paper Award 
 2007: Friedrich Wilhelm Bessel Research Award 
 2016: IEEE Eric E. Sumner Award
 2018: ACM SIGMOBILE Test-of-Time Paper Award 
 2021: IEEE Richard W. Hamming Medal
 2022: Claude E. Shannon Award

Bibliography

Books 
 A First Course in Information Theory, (Kluwer Academic/Plenum Publishers, 2002)
 

Network Coding Theory, (now Publishers, 2005) – with S.-Y. R. Li, N. Cai, and Z. Zhang
 
 

Information Theory and Network Coding, (Springer, 2008)
 

BATS Codes: Theory and Practice, (Morgan & Claypool Publishers, 2017) - with S. Yang

Journal Publications 
1991: "A new outlook on Shannon's information measures," IEEE Trans. on Information Theory

1994: "Matrix product-form solutions for Markov chains with a tree structure," Advances in Applied Probability - with B. Sengupta

1997: "A framework for linear information inequalities," IEEE Trans. on Information Theory

1998: "On characterization of entropy functions via information inequalities," IEEE Trans. on Information Theory – with Z. Zhang

2000: "Network information flow," IEEE Trans. on Information Theory – with  R. Ahlswede, N. Cai, and S.-Y. R. Li 

2002: “On a relation between information inequalities and group theory,” IEEE Trans. on Information Theory – with T. H. Chan

2003: "Linear network coding," IEEE Trans. Information Theory – with S.-Y. R. Li and N. Cai

2006: "Network error correction, Part I & Part II," Communications in Information and Systems - with N. Cai

2011: "Secure network coding on a wiretap network," IEEE Trans. Information Theory - with N. Cai

2014: "Batched sparse code," IEEE Trans. Information Theory - with S. Yang

2020: "Proving and disproving information inequalities," IEEE Trans. Information Theory - with S.-W. Ho, L. Ling, and C. W. Tan

MOOC 

Information Theory

Software 

1996: Information Theoretic Inequality Prover (ITIP)- with Y.-O. Yan

2020: AITIP - with S.-W. Ho, L. Ling, C. W. Tan

References

Living people
1962 births
Hong Kong people
Cornell University alumni
Academic staff of the Chinese University of Hong Kong